Battle of Đồng Đăng or Battle of Dong Dang may refer to:
Battle of Đồng Đăng (1885), occurring during the Sino-French War in 1885.
Battle of Đồng Đăng (1979), occurring during the Sino-Vietnamese War in 1979.